The Silas A. Rice Log House, located on Oregon Route 19 at Burns Park in Condon, Oregon, is a historic log house built in 1884 as a simple pen of hewn logs.  It was listed on the National Register of Historic Places in 1991.

It was a homesteader's cabin and is one of few surviving hewn log houses in a wide area of Oregon.  The cabin was named after Silas and Mary Jane Rice who relocated to Gilliam County from Utah in 1884, riding by covered wagon over the Oregon Trail. The cabin is constructed of Douglas fir logs, originally harvested by Silas from the Lost Valley area, about 17 miles southeast of Condon. The cabin was originally located about two miles from its current location, and eventually was abandoned and deteriorated slowly.  The cabin was moved by the Gilliam County Historical Society in 1987;  it was dismantled and reconstructed by hand and  "faithfully {reconstructed}in main part."

See also
National Register of Historic Places listings in Gilliam County, Oregon

References

Houses on the National Register of Historic Places in Oregon
National Register of Historic Places in Gilliam County, Oregon
Houses completed in 1884
Houses in Gilliam County, Oregon
Log houses in the United States
Log buildings and structures on the National Register of Historic Places in Oregon